The training routines (TR) are introductory services used in the Church of Scientology
as well as affiliated programs Narconon, Criminon and WISE. The church describes them as a way of learning to communicate effectively and to control situations. Some critics and former Scientologists claim the training routines have a strong hypnotic effect, causing hallucinations and an out-of-body experience known as exteriorization.

Training routines are used in the Narconon program to overcome influences that Scientology theory considers to be relevant to drug use and recidivism. The church claims that they have achieved a success rate of about 80 percent, but critics believe these claims to be baseless.

Lower TRs
These TRs, numbered 0–4, emphasize Scientology's "cycle of communication".

OT TR-0: Operating Thetan Confronting
Two students sit facing each other with their eyes closed. The routine ends when both students can sit for an extended period without movement or drowsiness.

TR-0: Confronting
In the first exercise, a student and coach face each other with eyes open. The routine ends when the student can confront the coach for at least two hours without movement, excessive blinking, or loss of attention. The second exercise is the same, except that the coach tries to distract the student both verbally and physically.

TR-0: Bullbait
The coach says things to the student to try to provoke a reaction. The coach may say or do anything except leaving the chair. The student must be able to sit and watch the coach without getting distracted or reacting in any way. If he does, the coach flunks him and the TR starts over. The coach will attempt to find the student's "buttons" (things that cause a reaction). The stated purpose of this TR is to train the student to be there in a communication situation without getting distracted.

TR-1: Dear Alice
The student reads several lines from Alice in Wonderland to the coach as if saying them himself. The coach either acknowledges the line or flunks the student according to whether the line is communicated clearly.

TR-2: Acknowledgements
The coach reads the student lines from Alice in Wonderland in a reversal of TR-1. The student must acknowledge each line so as to clearly end the cycle of communication.

TR-3: Duplicative question
The student repeatedly asks the coach, "Do birds fly?" or "Do fish swim?" If the coach answers the question, the student acknowledges the answer. If the coach says anything else, the student advises the coach that he will repeat the question, and then does so.

TR-4: Originations
The student repeatedly asks the coach a question as in TR-3. If the coach originates a statement unrelated to the question, the student handles the origination as needed and then continues the routine.

Upper Indoc TRs
These "Upper Indoc(trination)" Training Routines, numbered 6–9, emphasize the student's ability to control people and situations.

TR-6: Body Control
The student moves the coach's body around a room. In the first half of the routine the student "steers" the coach by silent actions. In the second half, the student uses verbal commands such as "Walk over to that wall." Each successful verbal command must be acknowledged.

TR-7: High School Indoc
This routine is similar to TR-6, except that the coach resists the student verbally and physically. The student may use physical contact to enforce a command. The routine continues until the student can fully control the coach despite attempts to stop control.

TR-8: Tone 40 on an Object
The student repeatedly commands an ashtray to stand up and sit down, acknowledging each action. Although the student holds the ashtray throughout the exercise, the goal is to cause the ashtray to move purely by tone 40 intention.

TR-9: Tone 40 on a Person
As in TR-6, the student moves the coach around a room with verbal commands. The coach resists, and the student must use a combination of smooth physical control and unspoken intention to make the coach obey. The routine continues until the student can maintain exact intention despite resistance.

See also
List of Scientology Security Checks
Scientology and hypnosis

Notes

Scientology beliefs and practices